Ivbie language may refer to:
The North Ivbie language, an alternate name for the Okpela language 
The South Ivbie language, an alternate name for the Afenmai language